Grigory Borisovich Yudin, also known as Greg Yudin, (b. 1983) is a Russian political scientist and sociologist. Yudin is an expert in public opinion and polling in Russia. He is columnist for the newspaper Vedomosti and the online magazine Republic, as well as the website Proekt. He has also written for Open Democracy.

Life
Yudin gained his BA and MA in sociology at the Higher School of Economics, Moscow. In 2012, he received a PhD in anthropology from the University of Manchester. He is a Senior Researcher in the Laboratory for Studies in Economic Sociology at the Higher School of Economics, and heads Russia's first MA program in political philosophy at the Moscow School for the Social and Economic Sciences.

In early 2022, Yudin warned of a lack of political awareness amongst the Russian population about the Russo-Ukrainian crisis. On 22 February 2022, Yudin predicted that Putin was "about to start the most senseless war in history". After participating in protest against the Russian invasion of Ukraine on 24 February 2022, he was beaten unconscious by police and needed treatment at the Sklifosovsky Institute in central Moscow.

Works
 (with Ivan Pavlyutkin)

References

External links
 Greg Yudin: From Democracy to Plebiscites. Why Voting Dominates our Democratic Imagination

1983 births
Living people
People from Fryazino
Russian political scientists
Russian sociologists
Russian columnists
Russian activists against the 2022 Russian invasion of Ukraine
Alumni of the University of Manchester
Higher School of Economics alumni
The New School alumni